Aziz Ansari: Buried Alive is a 2013 American stand-up comedy concert film written by and starring Aziz Ansari and directed by Dylan Southern and Will Lovelace, with cinematography by Martin Ahlgren. Shot at the Merriam Theater in Philadelphia during Ansari's Buried Alive Tour on April 13, 2013, it was released on November 1 of that year and became Netflix's first exclusive comedy special.

Synopsis 
Topics include Ansari's views on the institution of marriage, parenting, and love. The set has the theme of a wedding, with Ansari wearing a formal suit with a white boutonnière. When discussing Buried Alive in comparison to his first two specials, Intimate Moments for a Sensual Evening (2010) and Dangerously Delicious (2012), Ansari said:

Production 
The film was taped during Ansari's Buried Alive Tour across 75 cities around the world, where he performed at sold-out venues including New York's Carnegie Hall, London's Hammersmith Apollo, and Sydney's Opera House. The footage in the Netflix release was filmed during his performance at Philadelphia's Merriam Theater on April 13, 2013.

Release 
Buried Alive was Ansari's first Netflix special and debuted on November 1, 2013. It was released across all Netflix markets simultaneously. At the time of its release, it was Netflix's first exclusive comedy special.

Reception 
Buried Alive was well received by critics. Erik Adams of The A.V. Club gave it an A- and called it "a spectacularly entertaining hour-plus of stand-up, but it’s also an intriguing bit of cultural anthropology. Throughout the special, Ansari asks questions—as a character within his routines and to the members of his audience—and what he turns up is just as frequently funny as it is heartfelt and penetrating." Rolling Stone noted that it showed a more mature side of Ansari, but his material was still appealing to his younger fan base. "It feels more like social commentary rather than commentary on what it's like to be social. But old Aziz fans shouldn't fret – he still manages to slip in jokes about his younger self being molested and the notion of Xzibit raising a busload of babies."

Patrick Smith of The Daily Telegraph, who reviewed Ansari's sold-out tour stop at London's Apollo Hammersmith theatre, took notice of the comedian's outfit, writing, "Ansari's 70-minute set was none the less much like his attire: smart, sharp and slickly carried off... Buried Alive bristled with topicality and wit."

At the 2014 American Comedy Awards, Buried Alive was nominated for Comedy Special of the Year, but lost to Louis C.K.'s Oh My God.

See also 
 List of Netflix original stand-up comedy specials

References

External links 
 

2013 films
2013 comedy films
2013 direct-to-video films
American comedy films
American direct-to-video films
Direct-to-video comedy films
Films shot in Philadelphia
Netflix specials
Stand-up comedy concert films
3 Arts Entertainment films
2010s English-language films
2010s American films